Catherine Awino Abilla (born 1 April 1989) is a Kenyan rugby sevens player. She was selected as a member of the Kenya women's national rugby sevens team to the 2016 Summer Olympics. Abilla was in the Kenyan team that featured at the 2016 France Women's Sevens in the 2015–16 World Rugby Women's Sevens Series.

References

External links 
 
 

Living people
Female rugby sevens players
Rugby sevens players at the 2016 Summer Olympics
Olympic rugby sevens players of Kenya
Kenya international rugby sevens players
Kenya international women's rugby sevens players
1989 births